Eun-Suk Seo is a Korean-American astrophysicist known for her observational research on cosmic rays. She is a professor of physics at the University of Maryland, College Park, where she is also affiliated with the Institute for Physical Science and Technology and heads the Cosmic Ray Physics Group.

Education and career
Seo earned her doctorate in 1991 at Louisiana State University, under the joint supervision of William Vernon Jones and John Wefel. She joined the University of Maryland faculty in 1991.

Research
Seo has been a co-investigator on international astrophysical collaborations including the Advanced Thin Ionization Calorimeter, Alpha Magnetic Spectrometer, and Balloon-borne Experiment with Superconducting Spectrometer, and has been principal investigator on the Cosmic Ray Energetics and Mass Experiment (CREAM), both in its initial balloon-launched configuration and in its second-generation ISS-CREAM experiment sent aboard the International Space Station in 2017.

In 2019, NASA attempted to replace Seo as principal investigator on ISS-CREAM, and after a majority of the project's scientists supported Seo by rejecting NASA's chosen successor as principal investigator, they discontinued the experiment.

Service and recognition
Seo has been president of the Korean-American Scientists and Engineers Association, Korean-American Women in Science and Engineering, and Association of Korean Physicists in America. In 2010 she was elected as a Fellow of the American Physical Society (APS), after a nomination from the APS Division of Astrophysics, "for leading the development and utilization of particle detectors for balloon and space-based experiments to understand cosmic ray origin, acceleration and propagation, especially as Principal Investigator of the Cosmic Ray Energetics And Mass balloon-borne experiment over Antarctica".

References

Further reading
 (story about a talk by Seo at the Korean-American Scientific Cooperation Center near Washington, DC)
 (about the same talk)

External links
Cosmic Ray Physics Group at the University of Maryland

Living people
American astrophysicists
American women physicists
South Korean physicists
South Korean women scientists
University of Maryland, College Park faculty
Fellows of the American Physical Society
1971 births
21st-century American women